Kandhikuppam is a small village in the Krishnagiri district five kilometers from Bargur.

Villages in Krishnagiri district